Roy Nichols (March 3, 1921 – April 3, 2002) was an American infielder in Major League Baseball who played in 11 games for the New York Giants during the  baseball season. He later managed the Johnstown Johnnies of the Middle Atlantic League from 1948–1950.

Born in Little Rock, Arkansas, he died in Hot Springs, Arkansas, at age 81.

External links

1921 births
2002 deaths
Major League Baseball infielders
Baseball players from Arkansas
New York Giants (NL) players
Minor league baseball managers
Sportspeople from Little Rock, Arkansas
Amarillo Gold Sox players
Salisbury Giants players
Fort Smith Giants players
Natchez Giants players
Oklahoma City Indians players
Jersey City Giants players
Montreal Royals players
Mobile Bears players
Cambridge Dodgers players
Johnstown Johnnies players